Johanneshovs IP  was a football stadium in Stockholm, Sweden  and the former home stadium for the football team Hammarby IF before the construction of Söderstadion. It was founded in 1928 and was demolished in 1964 when Söderstadion was built on the existing site of the stadium

References 

Sports venues demolished in 1967
Defunct football venues in Sweden
Football venues in Stockholm
1928 establishments in Sweden
1967 establishments in Sweden
Sports venues completed in 1928